Ko Wen-je (born 6 August 1959), also known by his nickname, Ko P, is a Taiwanese politician and physician. Ko was mayor of Taipei from 2014 to 2022, and Chairman of the Taiwan People's Party since 2019. Before becoming mayor, he was a doctor at National Taiwan University Hospital. He was also a professor at National Taiwan University College of Medicine, and specialized in fields including trauma, intensive care, organ transplant, extracorporeal membrane oxygenation (ECMO), and artificial organs. Due to his profession, he has been nicknamed Ko P or KP (which stands for Professor Ko, and is how he is customarily referred to within National Taiwan University). Ko was responsible for standardising organ transplant procedures in Taiwan, and was the first physician to bring ECMO to Taiwan. Apart from his practice, Ko is known for his numerous media appearances and interviews as a social and political commentator.

In the 2014 Taipei Mayoral Election, Ko ran as an independent candidate. He beat Democratic Progressive Party (DPP) candidate Pasuya Yao in the unofficial primary, gaining support from the DPP and Taiwan Solidarity Union (TSU). Ko won the election with 853,983 votes, becoming the first physician mayor of the city since the introduction of direct election to the office.

Early life, education, and career

Ko Wen-je grew up in a modest household. His father, Ko Cheng-fa, had aspirations for Ko, as the eldest son, to become a medical doctor. His mother is Ho Jui-ying. After graduating from National Hsinchu Senior High School, Ko studied medicine for a year at National Yang-Ming University, before being accepted into the Medical School at NTU after resitting his university entrance exams.

Between August 1986 and September 1988, Ko served in the 269th mechanized infantry division of the Republic of China Army to fulfill his military service obligation. He was a combat medic with the rank of second lieutenant.

On graduation, Ko placed first nationwide on the medical license exams and received his medical license. On the advice of his professor, Dr. Chu Shu-hsun, Ko decided to specialize in surgery and critical care within the department of Emergency Medicine, working on the front lines of the emergency room. After working in emergency services for 11 years, Ko traveled to the United States in 1993 for a one-year clinical fellowship program on artificial liver research at the University of Minnesota under Wei-Shou Hu.

After returning to Taiwan in 1994, Ko continued to work in the emergency room while at the same time beginning his Ph.D. studies at NTU. With an invitation from Dr. Chu Shu-hsun, Ko helped found NTU's first organ transplant team, with the goal of performing heart transplants. Hoping to increase the transplant success rate, Ko introduced ECMO treatment from the US, and improved the transplant success rate from 19% to 51%. On 30 January 2008, Ko set a world record of 117 consecutive days for keeping a patient alive using ECMO. Using US treatment standards as a guide, Ko established a set of standards for organ transplant procedures in Taiwan that was later promulgated throughout Taiwan by the then Department of Health.

In 2002, Ko received his PhD degree in clinical medicine from NTU. Aside from his work improving medical technology in Taiwan, Ko has since the year 2000 participated in many foreign medical conferences in the People's Republic of China (PRC), where he was also responsible for introducing ECMO treatment to the nation.

On 15 July 2006, Ko wrote an article for the Min Sheng Daily titled "Reflections, Errors, and Apologies: Chao Chien-ming" that received considerable media attention and led to a number of politics-related interviews. On 18 November, Ko used ECMO to save the life of Shirley Shaw, wife of Taichung Mayor Jason Hu, who had fallen into a coma after a car accident. This incident in particular and the media attention it drew caused Ko Wen-je to become a household name.

In 2010, Ko introduced the American concept of integrated care to Taiwan, and established the Integrated Care Unit at NTU Hospital with the aim of reducing treatment cost and improving quality of treatment and quality of life for the attendant doctors and nurses. Ko directed the emergency care team that treated Sean Lien (Lien Sheng-wun) for critical wounds after he was shot in the face at close range with a 9mm pistol on 26 November. Lien recovered quickly, which led the media to speculate about the veracity of his story, but Ko quickly came forward to verify his claims.

On 24 August 2011, Ko was held responsible for an organ transplant error and subsequently reprimanded by National Taiwan University Hospital and the Ministry of Health of Taiwan. He was the acting director for a standard organ transplant procedure in which 5 patients received transplants from a coma patient who was HIV-positive. In 2012, the Control Yuan accused Ko of misconduct for violating organ transplant procedures.

In May 2013, the Investigation Bureau of the Ministry of Justice suspected Ko of involvement in the misappropriation of National Science Council funds by creating fraudulent receipts, and asked Ko for an itemized list of payment details. Ko was thus drawn into the Accounting Act Amendment scandal, but the Control Yuan never brought charges. In June that year, Ko's emergency trauma care student Dr. Tseng Yue-tsee was hit by a drunk driver and sustained major trauma. She was brought to the Far Eastern Memorial Hospital. Ko went to the hospital as soon as he was notified and oversaw her treatment, but she died. As a result of this incident, Ko started a foundation for the prevention of drunk driving. In August, Ko was invited by Control Yuan member Huang Huang-hsiung to attend a conference in Beijing and to visit Yan'an, Shaanxi Province. Ko became more focused on politics and announced his candidacy for Taipei City Mayor on 6 January 2014.

Ko has claimed to have Asperger syndrome.

Political stances

Ko provided support from the medical community when Chen Shui-bian was elected as Taipei City Mayor in 1994, as well as during his 2000 Presidential bid, when he ultimately took two weeks off work to support Chen's fundraising efforts. Ko is also a long-time member of the “Friends of A-bian Club”. As President, Chen opened the Ketagalan Institute in 2003, but the school was suspended for 3 years starting in 2008 after Chen stepped down and corruption charges were brought against the former president. In November 2012, the school resumed enrollment and Ko enrolled in a month-long course as a student under the guidance of Legislator Gao Jyh-peng, a long-time friend of Chen's.

On 20 June 2012, Ko organised a small treatment team for Chen Shui-bian, whose condition had worsened since his imprisonment, and issued a public statement signed by many prominent individuals in the medical community to demand Chen be released for medical treatment. Ko has made numerous statements expressing his view that Chen should be released for treatment, and has also expressed his view that Chen's prosecution was purely political.

Ko supported Tsai Ing-wen in her Presidential bid in 2012 and helped fundraising efforts for her campaign. He is also a permanent member of the pro-Tsai “Friends of Ing Club”. Nevertheless, he has criticized Tsai's proposal for a Taiwan Consensus over lack of clarity.

Ko has mentioned that his strategic goals are the same as those of the DPP. He has expressed his dislike for the KMT on numerous occasions. However, in September 2016, he reiterated that he would not join the DPP, and would remain independent until his mayoral term ended.

2014 Taipei mayoral election
On the evening of 6 January 2014, Ko announced his candidacy for Taipei City Mayor. On 16 January, he set up his campaign office and began bringing in campaign staff and volunteers. During a symposium in Kaohsiung, Ko revealed that the accusations of misconduct in the AIDS transplant incident were the main cause of his decision to run for Mayor. After announcing his candidacy, Ko was hesitant about whether or not he should join the DPP and run as the DPP candidate. He ultimately decided to run as an independent, but to retain coordination with the DPP.

During the DPP primaries, Ko refused to debate DPP candidates Annette Lu and Wellington Koo on numerous occasions. A number of "slips of the tongue" made it into the news, for example when Ko said that the "Lawyer Culture" of Taiwan should end, when he criticised Koo Lee-hsiung's Facebook posts grieving over the death of Trong Chai as "too emotional", and when he possibly unintentionally revealed confidential patient information.

After Pasuya Yao made it through the first round of DPP primaries, Ko agreed to a debate on 12 June, and subsequently won the DPP polls. On 16 June, the DPP agreed not to put forward a candidate for the election, and to support Ko as the representative of the Pan-Green Coalition, without forcing Ko to join any political party.

On 10 November, Ko announced his intention to reject further monetary donations to his campaign, as the amount received by 31 October exceeded the NT$87 million cap set for Taipei mayoral elections.

Ko's campaign was managed by Yao Li-ming (general manager), Lee Ying-yuan (political platform), Chi Cheng (civic organisations), and Chiou Yue-yee ("We Care" youth organisation). Ko's advisers included political scientist and politician Julian Kuo, political activist and filmmaker Yang Huei-ju, and former DPP secretary Chang Yee-shan. DPP city councillor Chien Yue-yen, neurologist Pan Cheng-chih, and two recruits from youth outreach efforts were the acting spokespeople for the campaign.

Organ harvesting controversy

In October 2014, reports surfaced that, according to Ethan Gutmann, an investigative writer who testified before the U.S. Congress on forced organ harvesting, Ko reportedly visited China in 2004 and tried to negotiate good prices for organs illegally harvested from newly executed Falun Gong practitioners. Ko denied the accusation, and said he told Gutmann that there were some doctors in Taiwan who had been involved in buying or selling organs for transplant, but that he was not one of them. He added that he did not know whether the organs came from Falun Gong practitioners or not, and that he only stated in the interview with Gutmann that the majority of organ sources in mainland China were unclear. Ko's office stated that a recording of a conversation between Gutmann and Ko drastically contradicted details provided by Gutmann. Ko also engaged an attorney to request Gutmann to correct all false allegations in his book. Gutmann responded saying he had not said that Ko was involved in the organ trade, and that he might have been intentionally misinterpreted.

On 27 November, Gutmann released a legal response with lawyer Clive Ansley, stating that "no English speaking reviewer of the book has understood page 255 in the way it has apparently been understood in Taiwan by readers whose first language is Chinese", meaning that he had never accused Ko of being an organ broker. Instead, readers have praised Ko for his significant contribution to "the international effort to expose the medical crimes which continue to be perpetrated in China." In addition, Gutmann and Ansley stated that "the book was peer-reviewed by three expert readers and subjected to a lengthy internal editing process by Prometheus. This review included not only the text itself, but also the author's notes, interview tapes, and electronic communications." In the endnotes of The Slaughter, Gutmann says he gave Ko an advance draft of the section, and that Ko signed off on it, and only a few minor edits were made afterwards. A full explanation, including the actual email correspondence where Ko signed off on the story for publication, was provided by Gutmann in December.

Election result

After the Taipei mayoral election on 29 November 2014, Ko emerged the winner. He appointed Teng Chia-chi, and Chou Li-fang deputy mayors. Chou resigned her post in January 2016 and was replaced by Chen Chin-jun.

2018 Taipei mayoral election
Ko Wen-je was narrowly reelected mayor of Taipei in 2018 Taiwanese local elections.

Election result

In March 2019, Ko named Tsai Ping-kun a deputy mayor of Taipei.

Personal life
Ko's wife, Chen Pei-chi, was born in Penghu, Taiwan. She graduated from Makung Senior High School and National Taiwan University's Department of Medicine. She is the director of Pediatrics for Taipei City Hospital, Heping Fuyou Women and Children's Health Branch. Ko and Chen had an arranged marriage, and have three children, one boy and two girls. It is known throughout Taiwan that as a mayor Ko earns less than his wife. He once joked that in order to pay off their home mortgage, his wife still could not retire early. Ko's son has Asperger syndrome; Ko believes he has the condition himself, but, as of 2014, had not been diagnosed.

References

External links

 
 
 

|-

1959 births
Living people
Politicians of the Republic of China on Taiwan from Hsinchu
Taiwanese surgeons
Taiwan People's Party politicians
Taiwanese people of Hoklo descent
University of Minnesota alumni
Traumatologists
National Taiwan University alumni
Academic staff of the National Taiwan University
Mayors of Taipei
Taiwanese political party founders
Leaders of political parties in Taiwan